This is a list of archaeological sites in Whitchurch–Stouffville, Ontario, Canada: Both the Trent University Site Designation number and the Borden System archaeological designations are given.

Late Ontario Iroquois (1400 AD - 1650 AD)

 Aurora (or Old Fort) Site (7Yk27; BaGu-27); 3.4 ha
 Location: Lots 14 and 15, Concession 6, West half.  44°00'N 79°20'W
 Date: 1550-1600 AD
 Aurora Isolated Site (7Yk24; BaGu-11)
 Location: Lot 15, Concession 6, West half.  44°00'N 79°20'W
 Chalk Site (7Yk20; BaGu-8)
 Location: Lot 16, Concession 4, East half.  44°00'N 79°22'W
 Clark Lake Site (7Yk23; BaGu-10)
 Location: Lot 14, Concession 5, East half. Entrance:   44°00'N 79°20'W
 Foote Site (7Yk26; AlGt-158)
 Location: East side of McCowan Road, north of Stouffville Road.  43°57'N 79°18'W
 Horton-Devins Site (7Yk22; BaGu-9)
 Location: East of Warden Avenue, north of Vandorf Sideroad.  44°01'N 79°20'W
 Hoshel-Huntly Site (7Yk21; AlGu-15) 
 Location: West of Warden Avenue, on the south side of Vandorf Sideroad.  44°00'N 79°22'W
 Mantle Site (AlGt-334); 4.2 ha; 90% excavated
 Location: Immediately west of Byers Pond Way, and south-west of Lost Pond Crescent.  43°57'49.9"N 79°14'12"W
 Date: 1500-1550 AD
 Preston Site (7Yk18; AlGu-9)
 Location: Lot 13, Concession 4, West half.   43°59'N 79°22'W
 Ratcliff (or Radcliffe) Site (7Yk25; AlGt-157); 2.8 ha
 Location: Lot 9, Concession 8, West half.  43°59'N 79°W
 Date: 1550-1600 AD
 Van Nostrand-Wright (or Vandorf) Site (7Yk19; A1Gu-13); 4.3 ha; limited excavation
 Location: Lots 14 and 15, Concession 4, West half; overlooking Van Nostrand Lake to the north-east.  43°59'N 79°23'W
 Date: 1550-1600 AD

See also
 Whitchurch–Stouffville
 Draper Site, Pickering, Ontario.

References

Whitchurch-Stouffville
Archaeological sites in Ontario
Iroquois populated places
First Nations history in Ontario
Wyandot
Ontario-related lists